Blueberry Hill is a census-designated place (CDP) in Bee County, Texas, United States. The population was 866 at the 2010 census. It is located just outside Beeville and has no services of its own. Drinking water and garbage services are provided by the city of Beeville. Mailing addresses for Blueberry Hill are labeled "Beeville".

Geography
Blueberry Hill is located southwest of Beeville at  (28.389303, -97.781611). U.S. Route 59 forms the southern edge of the CDP; the highway leads west  to George West and northeast through Beeville  to Goliad. The northeast edge of the CDP is formed by the 351 Bypass around Beeville. Beeville is a small town around an hour and 45 minutes Southeast of San Antonio. San Antonio is a large city around 3 hours Southwest of Waco, Texas.

Demographics
As of the census of 2000, there were 982 people, 316 households, and 238 families residing in the CDP. The population density was 335.6 people per square mile (129.4/km2). There were 370 housing units at an average density of 126.4/sq mi (48.8/km2). The racial makeup of the CDP was 66.60% White, 0.20% African American, 1.02% Native American, 0.20% Asian, 30.24% from other races, and 1.73% from two or more races. Hispanic or Latino of any race were 80.45% of the population.

There were 316 households, out of which 40.2% had children under the age of 18 living with them, 52.5% were married couples living together, 17.4% had a female householder with no husband present, and 24.4% were non-families. 16.1% of all households were made up of individuals, and 5.7% had someone living alone who was 65 years of age or older. The average household size was 3.11 and the average family size was 3.54.

In the CDP, the population was spread out, with 34.0% under the age of 18, 11.4% from 18 to 24, 27.0% from 25 to 44, 19.9% from 45 to 64, and 7.7% who were 65 years of age or older. The median age was 29 years. For every 100 females, there were 101.6 males. For every 100 females age 18 and over, there were 97.0 males.

The median income for a household in the CDP was $26,500, and the median income for a family was $26,250. Males had a median income of $27,273 versus $16,912 for females. The per capita income for the CDP was $9,255. About 39.5% of families and 45.3% of the population were below the poverty line, including 67.7% of those under age 18 and 21.7% of those age 65 or over.

Education
Blueberry Hill is served by the Beeville Independent School District.

References

External links
 Handbook of Texas Online article

Census-designated places in Bee County, Texas
Census-designated places in Texas